All Things Considered is a news program on the American network National Public Radio.

All Things Considered may also refer to:

All Things Considered (BBC radio show), a religious affairs program on BBC Radio Wales
"All Things Considered" (song), a song by Yankee Grey
All Things Considered, a book of essays by G. K. Chesterton (published 1908)
All Things Considered, an English title of the 1963 film À tout prendre